Walter Lantz Productions was an American animation studio. It was in operation from 1928 to 1972 and was the principal supplier of animation for Universal Studios.

The studio was originally formed as Universal Cartoon Studios on the initiative of Universal movie mogul Carl Laemmle, who was tired of the continuous company politics he was dealing with concerning contracting cartoons outside animation studios. Walter Lantz, who was Laemmle's part-time chauffeur and a veteran of the John R. Bray Studios with considerable experience in all elements of animation production, was selected to run the department.

In 1935, the studio was severed from Universal and became Walter Lantz Studio under Lantz's direct control, and in 1939, renamed to Walter Lantz Productions. Lantz managed to gain the copyright for his characters. The cartoons continued to be distributed by Universal through 1947, changing to United Artists distribution in 1947–49, and by Universal again from 1950 to 1972.

The most prominent characters for the studio were Woody Woodpecker, Andy Panda, Chilly Willy, and Oswald the Lucky Rabbit. The music-oriented Swing Symphony cartoons were another successful staple but ended after swing music's popularity faded after the end of World War II.

The company was succeeded by Universal Animation Studios and Amblimation until 1997, when it was closed. After Amblimation went defunct, Universal Animation Studios carried out the legacy of both companies.

History

1928–1935: The opening years of Universal Cartoon Studios 
Lantz began his career at the art department of William Randolph Hearst's New York American during the 1910s, having his start in the cartoon industry at Hearst's International Film Service, which in 1918 transferred its entire staff to Bray Productions. By the mid-1920s, Lantz was directing (and acting in) the studio's top cartoon, Dinky Doodle, also becoming a producer as Bray attempted to compete with Hal Roach and Mack Sennett by making live-action comedies. Bray Productions closed shop in 1928, and Lantz moved to Hollywood, trying to start a studio while trying to make a living in a succession of odd jobs, including driving Universal owner Carl Laemmle's limousine. The chauffeur job also landed Lantz at the Winkler Studio, which produced cartoons for Universal.

In early 1929, Universal was distributing the Oswald the Lucky Rabbit cartoons by Charles Mintz and George Winkler (created by Walt Disney). However, the popularity of the series was beginning to decline because of the lower quality of the output. Laemmle then fired Mintz and Winkler and was now looking for someone to head an in-house animation studio. Lantz won the studio in a poker bet with Laemmle. The first Lantz-produced "Oswald" cartoon was Race Riot, released on September 2, 1929. The first animators for the studio included Winkler veterans Rollin Hamilton, Tom Palmer and "rubber-hose" pioneer Bill Nolan. Bert Fiske scored the first cartoons, having done this for the few Winkler sound "Oswalds". Additions to the staff included Pinto Colvig and Fred Avery.

The earliest Lantz cartoons from 1928 were built around set plots and stories, in the tradition of the earlier Disney and Winkler Productions shorts. The conversion of Oswald cartoons into musicals was a different matter. However, by mid-1930, Lantz and his staff achieved this goal. Unfortunately, in the process, Oswald's personality became less consistent. It could and did change drastically to fit a particular gag. Lantz's musical directors changed as well. To replace David Broekman, Lantz brought in James Dietrich, a member of the Paul Whiteman Orchestra, making the jazz-era sound of the 1920s a quintessential element in the early Lantz cartoons. He remained as the permanent studio musical director until 1937. However, Lantz and Nolan worked in a character called "Fanny the Mule" for a 13-cartoon series announced by Laemmle in early 1930; these cartoons were never produced.

In 1931, Lantz faced economic difficulties and was forced to make cutbacks, shortening the lengths of his films and post-synchronizing a handful of the early Disney Oswalds. Another way out of the hole was to gain attention by creating a secondary series of shorts featuring a new star, Pooch the Pup. Lantz and Nolan would now divide the studio into two separate units. Lantz would direct the Pooch cartoons, while Nolan would work on the Oswalds, with both series referencing the dire straits of the Depression. However, Pooch never became very popular, and the series was dropped in 1933. The following year, Nolan left the studio, and the Cartune Classics series of Technicolor shorts began, lasting for a year.

1935–1940: The decline of Oswald and arrival of new characters 
Control of Universal by founder Carl Laemmle and his family was slipping away because of financial difficulties and came to an end in 1936. John Cheever Cowdin became Universal's new president. With the change in management, Lantz seized the opportunity to ask Universal for permission to make his studio independent. Universal agreed, and on November 16, 1935, Lantz broke off and claimed the studio for his own, even though it remained on the Universal lot.

During the mid-to-late 1930s, Oswald's popularity declined, and Lantz experimented with other characters to replace him. After a succession of failed attempts, the 1939 cartoon Life Begins for Andy Panda became an instant hit, and Andy Panda became a successful substitute for Oswald, who was retired in 1938. Lantz also switched to all-color production in 1939, shortly before Andy's debut.

In 1940, the Walter Lantz studio was in trouble. Universal once again was facing severe financial difficulties and possible bankruptcy and decided to cut their weekly advance to the now-independent Lantz studio. This left Lantz scrambling for alternative sources for funds, forcing him to shut down the studio for a while. Lantz was able to gain the rights to the characters of his films (including Oswald the Lucky Rabbit) and an Andy Panda cartoon, Crazy House, was developed into Lantz's first fully independent film. Lantz used the film as a final appeal to the heads of Universal and, in the end, was able to reach a satisfactory settlement with them. By autumn 1940, Lantz's studio was back in business again. 1940 also marked the debut of Lantz's biggest star: Woody Woodpecker, who debuted in the Andy Panda cartoon Knock Knock.

1940–1947: Swingin' Symphonies and a "Guess Who" 
Woody quickly became extremely popular, being given his own series in early 1941, and became one of the most famous examples of the "brash bird" cartoon characters of the late 1930s/early 1940s such as Daffy Duck. The success of Scrub Me Mama With A Boogie Beat and Boogie-Woogie Bugle Boy (the former becoming subject to controversy and even protest in later years over racial stereotypes) also led to the introduction of the Swing Symphony series that fall, often featuring popular musicians of the time. The series ended in 1945 at the twilight of the big band era.

After the studio's 1930s cartoons were scored by a succession of composers, including James Dietrich, Victor Records producer Nat Shilkret and Harman-Ising veteran Frank Marsales, Darrell Calker took over in late 1940. Calker's arrangements became noted for their distinctive swing flavor.

After Disney's success with Snow White and the Seven Dwarfs, the Lantz studio planned to make a feature, Aladdin and His Lamp, featuring the ascendant comedy duo of Abbott and Costello, but after Mr. Bug Goes to Town failed at the box office, Aladdin never made it to actual production. Late in the decade, Lantz attempted to do a feature-length cartoon again, but it never came to fruition.

1947–1949: United Artists and first closedown 
In 1947, Lantz renegotiated his seven-year Universal contract with Matty Fox, the new vice-president of Universal. But the deal was interrupted when new ownership transformed the company into Universal-International and did away with most of Universal's company policies. The new management insisted on getting licensing and merchandising rights to Lantz's characters. Lantz refused and withdrew from the parent company by 1947, releasing 12 cartoons independently through United Artists during 1947 and early 1949.

The cartoons from this period stand out for their slicker animation compared to the previous Universal releases, mostly because of the influence of director and Disney veteran Dick Lundy, as well as the addition of Disney veterans, such as Ed Love. This era also marked the end of the Andy Panda cartoons, whose popularity was waning.

Under the deal with United Artists, Lantz was supposed to receive percentages of box-office receipts to pay for the production costs of his cartoons. Unfortunately, UA attributed a tiny portion of the dollar amounts to Lantz's shorts from the features. This was because UA was, at the time, a struggling studio attempting to re-establish the position in the industry it had in the 1920s. The result was that Lantz exceeded his standing loan of $250,000 from Bank of America (he had left Irving Trust in 1942). So, at the recommendation of BAC president Joe Rosenberg, Lantz decided to shut down his studio temporarily at the end of 1949 until the loan was reduced. He asked Universal to reissue his older films during the hiatus, a request accepted by Universal President Nate Blumberg.

In the interim, Lantz made a series of film ads for Coca-Cola and introduced "The Woody Woodpecker Song" as the theme song for the character. He also went to Europe to look for studios that could animate his films there, approaching government incentives not found stateside, and lower labor costs. However, the postwar economic situation of these countries as well as the presence of stronger unions than in Hollywood led him to back out and keep making films in America.

1950–1967: Revival and venture to television 
In 1950, the Walter Lantz studio opened its doors once again. The first effort the studio produced was a brief sequence featuring Woody Woodpecker for the George Pal feature Destination Moon, released on June 27, 1950. Lantz then renegotiated with Universal for seven cartoons to be released the following year, provided that they all feature Woody Woodpecker. Lantz and his crew immediately set to work on the new batch of shorts. Two of these new films — Puny Express and Sleep Happy — were previously storyboarded by Ben Hardaway and Heck Allen during the United Artists period. In 1951, the new cartoons were finally released and became instant hits with audiences. They were so successful that Universal commissioned six more shorts for the following year. Overall, 1951 marked the beginning of a new era for the Walter Lantz studio.

During the mid-50s, the movie industry was suffering and losing money, meaning lower budgets for cartoons. By 1956, there were only seven animation producers in the short-subjects business, and by the end of the decade that number would dwindle to three. Walter Lantz and his distributor, Universal Pictures, knew that the only way to subsidize the rising costs of new shorts was to release their product to television. Norman Gluck, from Universal's short-subjects department, made a deal with the Leo Burnett Agency to release some older Lantz product on television. Burnett handled the Kellogg's cereal account, and Lantz soon met with the Kellogg's people to sign the contract. At first, Lantz was not very eager and admitted that he was only working in the medium because he was "forced into TV" and "cartoons for theaters would soon be extinct."

The Woody Woodpecker Show debuted on ABC on the afternoon of October 3, 1957, and lasted until September 1958. The series was seen once a week, on Thursday afternoons, replacing the first half hour of the shortened The Mickey Mouse Club. Lantz integrated his existing cartoons with new live-action footage, giving the show an updated look that satisfied both viewers and Lantz himself. The live-action and animation segments created for the show, called 'A Moment with Walter Lantz', featured an informative look at how the animation process for his "cartunes" worked and how the writers came up with stories and characters. The live-action segments were directed by Jack Hannah, who was fresh from the Disney Studio, where he had done similar live-action/animation sequences for the Disney show.

1967–1972: Final years 
By 1969, other movie studios had discontinued their animation departments, leaving Walter Lantz as one of the only two producers still making cartoons for theaters. The other studio was the upstart DePatie–Freleng Enterprises working for Lantz' former contractor, United Artists.

From 1967 to the studio's closure in 1972, Universal distributed the Lantz cartoons as packages, and theaters would play them in no particular order. Lantz finally closed up shop in 1972; he later explained that by then, it was economically impossible to continue producing them and stay in business, as rising inflation had strained his profits, and Universal serviced the remaining demand with reissues of his older cartoons. Bye Bye Blackboard, a Woody Woodpecker cartoon, was part of the final slate of cartoons made at the Walter Lantz studio. Thirteen were completed for the 1972 season: one with Chilly Willy, four starring the Beary Family, and the rest with Lantz' star character, Woody Woodpecker. Upon discovering that it would take a decade for his shorts to show a profit, Lantz himself decided to shut down company operations, and threw a farewell luncheon with his staff at the announcement on March 10, 1972, with him handing Woody watches to them.

Legacy 
Unlike other American major animation studios, the Lantz studio never continued full-time during the classic period of American animation, closing down in 1949 and reopening its doors two years later. It was finally shut down permanently in 1972, after the end of the Golden Age of American animation. Since then, the studio's characters have continued to be used in syndicated television series, and in licensed merchandise. Lantz re-issued six of the 1931–32 Disney Oswald cartoons, including Trolley Troubles, Great Guns! and The Ocean Hop.

Throughout the studio's history, it maintained a reputation as an animation house of medium quality. Lantz's animated shorts (dubbed "Cartunes") were considered superior to Terrytoons, Screen Gems, and Famous Studios, but they never gained the artistic acclaim of Walt Disney Productions, Warner Bros. Cartoons, MGM Cartoons, Fleischer Studios or UPA. However, the studio benefited from gaining talent from the other studios who were tired of the management there and usually found the Lantz studio a more enjoyable working environment. Tex Avery was just one of the many talents Walter Lantz Productions benefited from on the rebound.

In 1984, Lantz sold everything outright to MCA Inc. He painted landscapes in retirement, and still lifes of his cartoon characters. He died in 1994.

In February 2006, NBCUniversal (who still owns the Lantz library) sold the trademark rights to Oswald the Lucky Rabbit along with the copyright to the original 26 cartoons produced by Walt Disney to The Walt Disney Company. The sale was part of a deal that centered around both the rights to Oswald and NBC's acquisition of the rights to the NFL's weekly Sunday night game; in exchange for NBCUniversal selling the rights to Oswald to Disney, Al Michaels was freed from his contractual obligations with ESPN and ABC so he could join NBC and become the Sunday Night Football play-by-play man.

In July 2007, Universal Studios released The Woody Woodpecker and Friends Classic Cartoon Collection, a three-disc DVD box-set compilation of Lantz Cartunes. A second volume was released in April 2008, followed by a vanilla release in 2009, Woody Woodpecker Favorites, which contained no new-to-DVD material. Animation historian Jerry Beck, partly involved in the production of the DVD releases, has stated that plans for further volumes are currently on hold.

In 2008, Illumination, an animation production company founded by Chris Meledandri, made a deal with Universal Studios which positioned Illumination as NBCUniversal's family entertainment arm that would produce one to two films per year starting in 2010. Like Walter Lantz Productions, Illumination retains creative control, and Universal exclusively distributes the films.

Walter Lantz Productions Staff: 1928–1972

Producers 
Walter Lantz

Directors 
 Walter Lantz
 Bill Nolan
 Tex Avery
 Alex Lovy
Les Kline
 Rudy Zamora
Fred Kopietz
 Patrick Lenihan
 Burt Gillett
Elmer Perkins
 Ben Hardaway
 Emery Hawkins
 James Culhane
 Dick Lundy
 Don Patterson
Paul J. Smith (1953-1972)
 Ray Patterson
 Grant Simmons
 Jack Hannah (1960-1962)
 Sid Marcus (1963-1966)

Storyboard artists/writers 
 Walter Lantz
 Homer Brightman
 Dalton Sandifer
 Tedd Pierce
 Al Bertino
 Dick Kinney
 Cal Howard
 Sid Marcus
 Dale Hale

Music 
 Frank Marsales
 Darrell Calker (1940-1949, 1961-1964)
 Clarence Wheeler (1951-1966)
 Walter Greene (1962-1972)

Filmography 
Theatrical cartoons

See also 
List of Walter Lantz cartoon characters
Golden Age of American animation
Scrub Me Mama with a Boogie Beat

References

External links 
Official site for the Woody Woodpecker and Friends DVD collection
The Big Cartoon DataBase entry for Walter Lantz Productions cartoons
The Walter Lantz Cartune Encyclopedia
Walter Lantz animation art at Rubberslug

Walter Lantz Productions
1928 establishments in California
1972 disestablishments in California
1949 disestablishments in California
1950 establishments in California
American animation studios
French animation studios
American companies established in 1928
American companies established in 1950
American companies disestablished in 1972
Companies based in Los Angeles County, California
Defunct companies based in Greater Los Angeles
Defunct film and television production companies of the United States
Entertainment companies based in California
Mass media companies disestablished in 1949
Mass media companies disestablished in 1972
Mass media companies established in 1928
Mass media companies established in 1950
Re-established companies
Universal Pictures subsidiaries
Walter Lantz